The 1928 Boston Braves season was the 58th season of the franchise. The team finished seventh in the National League with a record of 50–103, 44½ games behind the St. Louis Cardinals.

In the offseason, Rogers Hornsby was traded to the Braves. It was the second trade in as many seasons for Hornsby, who had been traded to the New York Giants during the previous offseason. Hornsby managed to be the league's most productive hitter. He won his seventh batting title in 1928 with a .387 average, and led the league in on-base percentage (.498, a figure that only Hornsby himself topped among National Leaguers in the 20th century), slugging percentage (.632), and walks (107).   

The Braves played 9 consecutive doubleheaders between September 4 and September 15, totaling 18 games in just 12 days.

Offseason 
 December 14, 1927: Frank Gibson was purchased from the Braves by the St. Louis Cardinals.
 January 10, 1928: Shanty Hogan and Jimmy Welsh were traded by the Braves to the New York Giants for Rogers Hornsby.

Regular season

Season standings

Record vs. opponents

Notable transactions 
 August 14, 1928: Emilio Palmero was purchased by the Braves from the Toledo Mud Hens.

Roster

Player stats

Batting

Starters by position 
Note: Pos = Position; G = Games played; AB = At bats; H = Hits; Avg. = Batting average; HR = Home runs; RBI = Runs batted in

Other batters 
Note: G = Games played; AB = At bats; H = Hits; Avg. = Batting average; HR = Home runs; RBI = Runs batted in

Pitching

Starting pitchers 
Note: G = Games pitched; IP = Innings pitched; W = Wins; L = Losses; ERA = Earned run average; SO = Strikeouts

Other pitchers 
Note: G = Games pitched; IP = Innings pitched; W = Wins; L = Losses; ERA = Earned run average; SO = Strikeouts

Relief pitchers 
Note: G = Games pitched; W = Wins; L = Losses; SV = Saves; ERA = Earned run average; SO = Strikeouts

Farm system

Notes

References 
1928 Boston Braves season at Baseball Reference

Boston Braves seasons
Boston Braves
Boston Braves
1920s in Boston